"Uriel" is a poem by American writer Ralph Waldo Emerson.

Overview
The poem, describing the "lapse" of Uriel, is regarded as a "poetic summary of many strains of thought in Emerson's early philosophy".

"Once, among the Pleiads walking,
Said overheard the young gods talking;
And the treason, too long pent,
To his ears was evident.
The young deities discussed
Laws of form, and metre just,
Orb, quintessence, and sunbeams."

The leader of the speculating young is Uriel, who with "low tones" and "piercing eye" preaches against the presence of lines in nature, thus introducing the idea of progress and the eternal return. A shudder runs through the sky at these words, and "all slid to confusion".

Steven E. Whicher has speculated that the poem is autobiographical, inspired by Emerson's shock at the unfavorable reception of the "Divinity School Address".

F. O. Matthiessen focused instead on the philosophical content of the poem, arguing that "the conflict between the angel-doctrine of 'line' and Uriel's doctrine of 'round' is identical to the antithesis of 'Understanding' and 'Reason' which, under different aspects, was the burden of most of Emerson's early essays" (74). The topic of lines and circles has also been discussed by Sherman Paul (18-23 for lines and 98-102 for circles).

Robert Frost called "Uriel" "the greatest Western poem yet" in his essay "On Emerson". He also alluded to it in A Masque of Reason and "Build Soil".

Poem

It fell in the ancient periods,
Which the brooding soul surveys,
Or ever the wild Time coined itself
Into calendar months and days.

This was the lapse of Uriel,
Which in Paradise befell.
Once, among the Pleiads walking,
Said overheard the young gods talking;
And the treason, too long pent,
To his ears was evident.
The young deities discussed
Laws of form, and metre just,
Orb, quintessence, and sunbeams,
What subsisteth, and what seems.
One, with low tones that decide,
And doubt and reverend use defied,
With a look that solved the sphere,
And stirred the devils everywhere,
Gave his sentiment divine
Against the being of a line.
"Line in nature is not found;
Unit and universe are round;
In vain produced, all rays return;
Evil will bless, and ice will burn."
As Uriel spoke with piercing eye,
A shudder ran around the sky;
The stern old war-gods shook their heads;
The seraphs frowned from myrtle-beds;
Seemed to the holy festival
The rash word boded ill to all;
The balance-beam of Fate was bent;
The bounds of good and ill were rent;
Strong Hades could not keep his own,
But all slid to confusion. 

A sad self-knowledge, withering, fell
On the beauty of Uriel;
In heaven once eminent, the god
Withdrew, that hour, into his cloud;
Whether doomed to long gyration
In the sea of generation,
Or by knowledge grown too bright
To hit the nerve of feebler sight.
Straightway, a forgetting wind
Stole over the celestial kind,
And their lips the secret kept,
If in ashes the fire-seed slept.
But now and then, truth-speaking things
Shamed the angels' veiling wings;
And, shrilling from the solar course,
Or from fruit of chemic force,
Procession of a soul in matter, 
Or the speeding change of water,
Or out of the good of evil born,
Came Uriel's voice of cherub scorn,
And a blush tinged the upper sky,
And the gods shook, they knew not why.

Notes

References
F. O. Matthiessen: American Renaissance, 1941.
Sherman Paul: Emerson's Angle of Vision, Harvard University Press, 1952.
Stephen E. Whicher: Freedom and Fate. Philadelphia, 1953.
Hugh H. Witemeyer: "'Line' and 'Round' in Emerson's 'Uriel'", PMLA, March 1967: 98-103.

External links

 Text and bibliography on American Transcendentalism Web

American poems
Poetry by Ralph Waldo Emerson
1846 poems
Uriel